Nerisopam (GYKI-52322, EGIS-6775) is a drug which is a 2,3-benzodiazepine derivative, related to tofisopam. It has potent anxiolytic and neuroleptic effects in animal studies.

See also
Benzodiazepine

References

Benzodiazepines
Phenol ethers